Adesmus colligatus is a species of beetle in the family Cerambycidae. It was described by Redtenbacher in 1867. It is known from Brazil, Argentina, and Paraguay.

References

Adesmus
Beetles described in 1867